Ch'aki Mayu (Quechua ch'aki dry, mayu river, "dry river", Hispanicized spelling Chaqui Mayu) is a Bolivian river in the Cochabamba Department, Quillacollo Province, Sipe Sipe Municipality. It is a right affluent of the Rocha River which belongs to the Amazon river basin. Ch'aki Mayu flows in a large bow from the west to the east around Sipe Sipe. The confluence with the Rocha River is south east of the town.

See also
List of rivers of Bolivia

References

Rivers of Cochabamba Department